Ever Rest is the home and studio of Jasper F. Cropsey, a painter in the Hudson River School.  The historic house museum is located in Hastings-on-Hudson, New York and was built in 1835.  Cropsey acquired the property in 1886 and built an artist studio addition which was completed in 1888. It is owned and managed by Newington-Cropsey Foundation which preserves the house and the work of Cropsey.

It was added to the National Register of Historic Places in 1973.

References

External links

Newington Cropsey Foundation

Cropsey, Jasper F., House and Studio
Cropsey, Jasper F., House and Studio
Houses completed in 1832
Artists' studios in the United States
Biographical museums in New York (state)
Art museums and galleries in New York (state)
Historic house museums in Westchester County, New York
National Register of Historic Places in Westchester County, New York